The Lorenzo D. Hawkins House is a historic house at 1 Cedar Street in Stoneham, Massachusetts.  The property consists of a house and carriage house, both built c. 1870, that are among Stoneham's finest Second Empire buildings.  The house is a two-story wood-frame structure with irregular massing.  It has the classic mansard roof, an ornately decorated entry porch, heavily bracketed cornice, and round-arch windows in its dormers and front bay.  The carriage house features a polychrome mansard roof.

The house was listed on the National Register of Historic Places in 1984, and was included in the Nobility Hill Historic District in 1990.

See also
National Register of Historic Places listings in Stoneham, Massachusetts
National Register of Historic Places listings in Middlesex County, Massachusetts

References

Houses in Stoneham, Massachusetts
Houses on the National Register of Historic Places in Stoneham, Massachusetts
Second Empire architecture in Massachusetts
Houses completed in 1870
Historic district contributing properties in Massachusetts
Buildings with mansard roofs